Sir Robert James Buckland  (born 22 September 1968) is a British politician who served as Secretary of State for Wales from July to October 2022. He previously served as Secretary of State for Justice and Lord Chancellor from 2019 to 2021. A member of the Conservative Party, he has been Member of Parliament (MP) for South Swindon since 2010.

Buckland was Solicitor General for England and Wales from 2014 to 2019 and Minister of State for Prisons from May to July 2019. He was appointed Secretary of State for Justice and Lord Chancellor by Boris Johnson in July 2019, serving until the cabinet reshuffle in September 2021. In July 2022, following the mass resignation of ministers from the government, he was appointed Secretary of State for Wales by Johnson, and continued to serve in the position under Liz Truss; he resigned from the role when new Prime Minister Rishi Sunak took office in October 2022.

Early life and career
Buckland was born on 22 September 1968 in Llanelli, Wales. He was educated at Old Road County Primary School and then at St Michael's School, Llanelli.

He studied at Hatfield College, University of Durham, where he became Secretary of the Junior Common Room and President of the Durham Union Society in Michaelmas term 1989. He graduated in Law in 1990, and the following year was called to the bar at the Inner Temple.

Buckland practised as a barrister in Wales from 1992 to 2010, specialising in criminal law in the Crown Court at Swansea, Cardiff, Merthyr and Newport.  He was appointed as a recorder in 2009, sitting as a part-time judge in the Crown Court. He was appointed Queen's Counsel in 2014 on becoming Solicitor General and was elected as a Master of the Bench of Inner Temple.

Entry into politics
Buckland stood as the Conservative Party candidate for Elli ward on Dyfed County Council in May 1993, winning the seat from Labour with a majority of just 3 votes. It was reported that he was the first Conservative "in living memory" to have been elected in the Llanelli area. Following local government reorganisation, the Elli Ward became part of the unitary Carmarthenshire County Council and Buckland stood again in 1995 where he lost to the Labour candidate by over 200 votes.

In 1994, Buckland stood unsuccessfully as the Conservative Party candidate for the safe Labour European Parliament seat of South Wales West. The following year he stood unsuccessfully as the Conservative Party candidate for the safe Labour parliamentary seat of Islwyn in the by-election caused by the appointment of the sitting MP Neil Kinnock as a European Commissioner. This by-election was held at a time of unpopularity for the Conservative government, and was comfortably won by the Labour candidate Don Touhig, Buckland polling only 3.9% of the vote.

He went on to stand unsuccessfully for the Conservative Party as their candidate for Preseli Pembrokeshire at the 1997 general election. He was on the Conservative Party list of candidates for Wales at the 1999 European elections, but was again unsuccessful.

In 2005, Buckland was selected as the Conservative Party's prospective Parliamentary candidate for South Swindon, replacing the constituency's former MP Simon Coombs. At the 2005 general election, Buckland lost to Labour candidate Anne Snelgrove, who polled 17,534 votes to his 16,181, a narrow majority of 1,353 votes.

Parliamentary career

Cameron–Clegg ministry
Following defeat in 2005, Buckland won the South Swindon seat at the 2010 general election with a majority of 3,544 votes. This represented a swing of 5.51% to the Conservatives. He obtained 19,687 votes, (41.8% of the total) compared to 16,143 votes for Snelgrove.

In 2010, Buckland was elected to the Justice Select Committee. In 2012, Buckland along with fellow Tory MP Stuart Andrew, called for prisoners' mobile phones to be destroyed or sold to raise money for victims' charities, saying that mobiles in prison were a "menace" and that selling them would provide a service to the country, as it costs £20,000 a year to store criminals' phones. They were both supported by Parliamentary Under-Secretary of State for Legal Aid and Legal Services Jeremy Wright and Shadow Secretary of State for Justice Sadiq Khan. He chaired the All Party Group on Autism from 2011 to 2014 and was an officer of the all-party group on Speech, Language and Communication.

On 4 December 2012, Buckland was elected Joint Secretary of the influential 1922 Backbench Committee. He was also Chair of the Conservative Human Rights Commission from 2011 to 2014. He sat on the Standards Committee and the Privileges Committee from 2012 to 2014.  He also served on the Joint Committee on Human Rights from 2013 to 2014 and the Joint Committee on Privacy and Superinjunctions which was convened from 2011 to 2012.

On 15 July 2014, Buckland was appointed Solicitor General for England and Wales, replacing Oliver Heald as part of a wide-ranging Government reshuffle.

As Solicitor General, Buckland took the Serious Crime Bill 2014 (now the Serious Crime Act 2015) through its Commons stages in Bill Committee. The Bill contained provisions that, amongst other things, updated the criminal law of child neglect and introduced a criminal offence of coercive control of people within close relationships in a domestic context. As a backbencher, he had campaigned on these issues. In 2015, he worked with Home Office Minister James Brokenshire to take the Immigration Bill through its Commons stages. In 2016, he successfully helped to take the Investigatory Powers Bill through its Commons stages.

His appointment as Solicitor General for England and Wales in July 2014 attracted media attention after it was revealed he had been found guilty of professional misconduct by the Bar Standards Board in 2011. He had headed up an investigation in 2008 into a racially motivated attack at a school at which he was a governor. Despite having no legal grounds to do so, Buckland sought to obtain documents relating to the incident that were held by a barrister representing one of the pupils involved. In response, the attorney general's office stated that Buckland's breach had been "minor" and that the finding "was removed from the Bar records after two years and therefore Mr Buckland was not required to declare it upon appointment as Solicitor General."
 
In February 2015, it was reported that Buckland was one of a number of individuals investing in the Invicta Film Partnership, which HM Revenue and Customs (HMRC) had alleged to be a tax avoidance scheme. This followed a tax tribunal that had ruled that two film partnership schemes were being used primarily for tax avoidance rather than for business purposes and that the investors were not therefore entitled to the claimed tax relief. Buckland responded that he had not attempted to avoid tax and his investments were a matter of public record. He argued his financial adviser had looked into the companies and found them to be completely beyond reproach.

Cameron ministry
In the 2015 general election, Buckland retained his seat with an increased majority of 5,785 votes, a swing of 2.2% to the Conservatives and an increase of 4.5% in the Conservative vote.

In January 2016, the Labour Party unsuccessfully proposed an amendment in Parliament that would have required private landlords to make their homes "fit for human habitation". According to Parliament's register of interests, Buckland was one of 72 Conservative MPs who voted against the amendment who personally derived an income from renting out property. The Conservative Government had responded to the amendment that they believed homes should be fit for human habitation but did not want to pass the new law that would explicitly require it.

In 2016 it was reported that his preference was to remain in the EU.

May ministry

In the 2017 general election, Buckland again held his seat, but with a decreased majority of 2,484 votes, a swing of 3.5% to Labour but with an increase of 8.9% in the Conservative vote.

In May 2019, Buckland was appointed as Minister of State for Prisons and Probation at the Ministry of Justice in succession to Rory Stewart who had been appointed as Secretary of State for International Development. Buckland was replaced as Solicitor General for England and Wales by Lucy Frazer.

Secretary of State for Justice
On 24 July 2019, Buckland was appointed Justice Secretary and Lord Chancellor by incoming Prime Minister Boris Johnson. He was sworn in as a Member of the Privy Council the next day. He was the second Lord Chancellor from Llanelli, after Lord Elwyn-Jones (1974–1979).

He said that he had considerable relevant experience and expressed an intention to "help drive through a massive programme of change".

A week after being sworn-in, in an interview for The Times newspaper, he expressed the opinion that suspects accused of serious crimes should be granted anonymity if the accusations threatened their reputation, stating "let's say you are a reputable local business person who is accused of fraud. Your good name is going to be really undermined by this mere accusation. That might be a meritorious case for anonymity." In response to the interview, Ian Murray, director of the Society of Editors, said it was "absurd to suggest that in a liberal democracy we are going to create a system of justice that enables the rich, the powerful and celebrities to be protected when they are under investigation for serious crimes but the ordinary man or woman would be offered no such protections." Buckland's opinion was rejected by a Government spokesman, who confirmed "this is not government policy", and the Ministry of Justice, which confirmed "this isn't departmental policy" and stated that Buckland would not be giving further interviews on the subject, which would now be handled by Downing Street.

In the House of Commons Buckland sat on the Speaker's Advisory Committee on Works of Art, Statutory Instruments (Select and Joint Committees), Standards and Privileges Committee, Privacy and Injunctions (Joint Committee), Consolidation Bills (Joint Committee), Justice Committee and Human Rights (Joint Committee).

At the 2019 Conservative Party Conference, Buckland set out plans to ensure that sexual and violent offenders would be required to serve two-thirds of the custodial sentence in prison, as opposed to half.

In December 2019, Buckland was re-elected as MP for Swindon South for a fourth time with an increased majority of 6,625, a swing of 4.1% from Labour.

In January 2020 Buckland announced he wished to open a new prison in Wales, despite the recent withdrawal of plans for a 1,600 prisoner "category C super-prison" in Port Talbot. The proposal came after Boris Johnson's plan to create a further 10,000 prison places in England and Wales. The BBC at the time cited Cardiff University and Wales Governance Centre research which found Wales has "the highest imprisonment rate in western Europe".

In September 2020 Buckland stated on The Andrew Marr Show that he would resign only if the UK Internal Market Bill broke the law "in a way I find unacceptable". Buckland defended plans to potentially override the EU withdrawal agreement as an emergency Brexit "insurance policy". He said he hoped powers being sought by ministers in the Internal Market Bill would never be needed, as a solution could be found with the EU.

Buckland oversaw a UK prison management response to the COVID-19 pandemic which increased the time prisoners spent in their cells, but achieved what were seen as low infection rates.

On 15 September 2021, Buckland was dismissed as Justice Secretary after Johnson reshuffled his cabinet.

Secretary of State for Wales
He was reinstated into Johnson's cabinet on 7 July 2022 when he succeeded Simon Hart as Secretary of State for Wales.

On 13 August, Buckland wrote an article in The Daily Telegraph, changing his support from Rishi Sunak to Liz Truss in the July–September 2022 Conservative Party leadership election after disagreements with the former about the proposed British Bill of Rights.

On 6 September 2022, he was re-appointed by Prime Minister Liz Truss. It was reported that he declined to take up the role of Secretary of State for Northern Ireland. As Welsh Secretary, Buckland played a role in the proceedings following the death of Queen Elizabeth II, attending the historic Accession Council and the proclamation of accession of King Charles III at Cardiff Castle.

At the 2022 Conservative Party Conference, Buckland stated his view that benefits should be uprated in line with inflation amid a public debate on the matter, along with fellow cabinet ministers Penny Mordaunt and Chloe Smith.

Return to the backbenches
On 25 October 2022, Buckland stood down from the Government upon Rishi Sunak's appointment as Prime Minister. He subsequently returned to the backbenches.

Awards
In 2011, Buckland was awarded the "Politician of the Year Award" by the Royal College of Speech and Language Therapists for his campaigning work on speech, language and communication issues. 

In January 2013, Buckland was awarded the "Grassroot Diplomat Initiative Award" under the Social Driving category for his extensive work on advocating awareness at Parliament for children with special educational needs, including those with autism both locally and nationally.

He was appointed Knight Commander of the Order of the British Empire (KBE) in the 2022 Political Honours and was invested by His Majesty King Charles III in November 2022.

Personal life
Buckland is married to Sian, whom he met at university. They had twins in 2002, and live in Wroughton in his Wiltshire constituency. Buckland's interests include music, wine, political history and watching rugby and cricket. Buckland has a cat, named "Mrs Landingham" after a character on The West Wing.

References

External links
Robert Buckland's weblog

 Robert Buckland MP, Grassroot Diplomat

1968 births
Living people
People educated at St Michael's School, Llanelli
Alumni of Hatfield College, Durham
Conservative Party (UK) MPs for English constituencies
UK MPs 2010–2015
UK MPs 2015–2017
Solicitors General for England and Wales
People from Llanelli
Councillors in Wales
Conservative Party (UK) councillors
British King's Counsel
UK MPs 2017–2019
Members of the Inner Temple
Secretaries of State for Wales
Lord chancellors of Great Britain
Secretaries of State for Justice (UK)
Members of the Privy Council of the United Kingdom
Presidents of the Durham Union
Knights Commander of the Order of the British Empire
Members of Dyfed County Council
UK MPs 2019–present
Free Enterprise Group
Politicians awarded knighthoods